In mathematics, a normal surface is a surface inside a triangulated 3-manifold that intersects each tetrahedron so that each component of intersection is a triangle or a quad (see figure).  A triangle cuts off a vertex of the tetrahedron while a quad separates pairs of vertices.  A normal surface may have many components of intersection, called normal disks, with one tetrahedron, but no two normal disks can be quads that separate different pairs of vertices since that would lead to the surface self-intersecting.

Dually, a normal surface can be considered to be a surface that intersects each handle of a given handle structure on the 3-manifold in a prescribed manner similar to the above.

The concept of normal surface can be generalized to arbitrary polyhedra.  There are also related notions of almost normal surface and spun normal surface.

The concept of normal surface is due to Hellmuth Kneser, who utilized it in his proof of the prime decomposition  theorem for 3-manifolds.  Later Wolfgang Haken extended and refined the notion to create normal surface theory, which is at the basis of many of the algorithms in 3-manifold theory.  The notion of almost normal surfaces is due to Hyam Rubinstein. The notion of spun normal surface is due to Bill Thurston. 

Regina is software which enumerates normal and almost-normal surfaces in triangulated 3-manifolds, implementing Rubinstein's 3-sphere recognition algorithm, among other things.

References 

 Hatcher, Notes on basic 3-manifold topology, available online
 Gordon, ed. Kent, The theory of normal surfaces, 
 Hempel, 3-manifolds, American Mathematical Society, 
 Jaco, Lectures on three-manifold topology, American Mathematical Society, 
 R. H. Bing, The Geometric Topology of 3-Manifolds, (1983) American Mathematical Society Colloquium Publications Volume 40, Providence RI, .

Further reading

3-manifolds